"Spring Rain" is a song by Pat Boone that reached number 50 on the Bllboard Hot 100 in 1960.

Track listing

Charts

References 

1960 songs
1960 singles
Pat Boone songs
Dot Records singles